Nicolás Fernández may refer to::

Association footballers
 Nico Fernández (born 1986), Argentine attacking-midfielder
 Nicolás Fernández (footballer, born 1996), Argentine centre-forward
 Nicolás Fernández (footballer, born 1998), Uruguayan midfielder
 Nicolás Fernández (footballer, born 1999), Chilean full-back
 Nicolás Fernández (footballer, born 2000), Argentine winger
 Nicolás Fernández (footballer, born 2003), Uruguayan midfielder

Other people
 Nicolás Fernández Miranda (born 1972), Argentine rugby union scrum half
 Nicolás Fernández (politician), Argentine Justicialist Party politician